The Mountain Top Arboretum (183 acres), located in Tannersville, New York, United States is located  in New York's Catskill Mountains.

The Mountain Top Arboretum is a living museum of trees and shrubs created for the education and pleasure of the public.  Its founders, the Ahrens family, designed and planted a seven-acre mountain top area starting in 1977, to display the range of native and exotic trees and shrubs that successfully adapt to the rigorous climate at 2,400 feet elevation. There are twenty three acres of displays in three distinct areas: the West Meadow, the Woodland Walk, and the East Meadow, and a 163-acre  wild forest and wetland area called Black Spruce Glen which has trails along a fen, bogs, old growth hemlocks and mixed hardwood forest. The Arboretum is home to a wide range of mammals and amphibians. Over 70 species of birds can be seen and heard throughout the various habitats found throughout the Arboretum.

The Arboretum currently contains 50 species of conifers, and many species of oak, maple, rowan, hawthorn, Rhododendron, Kalmia, and wildflowers. Other plantings include Turkish Fir, weeping katsura, Japanese Larch, Dawn Redwood, Bald cypress, Incense-cedar, Rocky Mountains Bristlecone Pine, goldenseal, ginseng, maidenhair fern, Hepatica, blue cohosh, flowering crabapples, fantail pussy willows, ash, viburnum, lilac, fringe tree, Fothergilla, daylilies, Clethra, Stewartia, bottlebrush buckeye, American holly, beeches and bayberry.

See also 
 List of botanical gardens in the United States

References

External links
Mountain Top Arboretum

Arboreta in New York (state)
Protected areas of Greene County, New York